"Time Stops" is the 24th episode of the eleventh season of the American television medical drama Grey's Anatomy, and the 244th episode overall. It aired on May 7, 2015 on ABC in the United States. The episode was written by Meg Marinis and directed by Kevin McKidd. On its initial airing it was watched by 7.74 million viewers.

In the episode a fresh batch of surgical interns join the hospital's internship program. It's the wedding day of Richard Webber (James Pickens Jr.) and Catherine Avery. Owen Hunt (Kevin McKidd) declares that he’s been Chief long enough. Richard recommends Miranda Bailey (Chandra Wilson) for the job. Jackson Avery (Jesse Williams) and April Kepner (Sarah Drew) look to reconcile their marriage amidst the news of a collapsed tunnel.

Plot
Jackson is in the middle of hearing how his April has changed since her time in combat from his bride-to-be mom when news comes in of a collapsed tunnel. With the collapse of a tunnel sending multiple victims to Grey Sloan Memorial Hospital, April, Maggie, Amelia, and Meredith take off to the site to help rescue others.

Richard, now serving as interim Chief of Surgery since Owen resigned, is giving his famous first day speech to the new round of interns. It’s also Richard and Catherine’s wedding day, and while it starts out great, it quickly turns sour when Catherine and Richard begin to fight.

After Meredith decides that she can’t save a patient, Amelia asks her when she knows that nothing else can be done to save them. She continues to berate Meredith about how she let Derek die without calling her to save him.

Meredith finds herself unable to remain in her home, which Derek had planned and built from scratch, any longer and asks Alex if she and the kids can move back in with him and Jo. Richard postpones his wedding, Jackson tells Owen that he and April aren’t on the same page since her trip overseas, Alex and Jo hit a rough spot, and Maggie receives bad news from her mom.

April, being the new her, brings one of the trapped patients (still in his car) to the hospital.

Reception

Ratings
"Time Stops" was originally broadcast on May 7, 2015 in the United States on the American Broadcasting Company (ABC). The episode was watched by a total of 7.74 million down from the previous episode. In the key 18-49 demographic, the episode scored a 2.1/8 in Nielsen ratings down 9 and 15 percent from the previous two episodes respectively.

Reviews
The episode received generally positive reviews. Wetpaint gave a positive review and wrote, "Fingers crossed we’re done crying at Grey’s Anatomy, right? Fortunately, tonight’s episode was a little more lighthearted than what Shonda Rhimes & Co have been giving us lately, although the dark stuff will definitely be there." TV Fanatic was all-praise for the episode stating, "As sad as I am that Derek is gone, I have to say, I like where this is heading. The idea of Meredith being back in her house, with her friends, in a community is just what she needs, and it also seems to be the way she thrives." lauding the transformation for April Kepner calling her a "rockstar", "April is a rock star. I hate to see her having problems with Jackson, but I love the change she's going through. She looked like a freakin' superhero bringing in the car with that trapped patient the other doctors left behind."

TV Equals also lauded Kepner wrote, "After spending the whole episode being a total downer about pretty much every patient, April took a page out of Owen's book and was spectacularly innovative. The team had decided that Keith wouldn't survive being extracted from the care because he was too far from the hospital. So April had the entire car towed to the hospital. You GO, Kepner! (Keith) brought out the super hero in April." and added, " I'm kind of digging this darker, grittier April." On Amelia-Meredith duel the site wrote, "Amelia lost her brother, but Meredith lost her husband and the father of her children. I found the total disregard for that to be completely off-putting. I know I'm supposed to feel badly for Amelia yet she is so self-absorbed about it all that I'm on Team Meredith for this one."

Entertainment Weekly gave a mixed review for the episode, "(this) Episode was a return to Grey’s of episodes past—and while the normalcy was welcome, the hour was mostly disappointing." praising Alex's and Meredith friendship, "Although I’m all-around down on the show at this point, I am intrigued by Alex and Meredith’s growing friendship.  It’s sweet to see him attached to something, and especially sweet knowing that Meredith is part of that attachment. Hooray for loyalty!" Guardianlv gave a positive review, "Overall, the Grey’s Anatomy episode was quite light. It was back to what it always did best; telling the medical story. TV Overmind praised  Justin Chambers' character noting his development from the first season, "As a first-year intern Alex was a cocky, rude man-whore. He had nothing but ambition and no time for emotional attachments, other than the dysfunctional ones he had with his family. Since then he has put down solid roots with an esteemed career, a healthy relationship, and good friends." and on the Richard Webber-Catherine Avery wedding they wrote, "Catherine proves she really is made for Richard because she just happily switches gears and comes to the hospital to help with the onslaught of patients. However, Catherine teeters on the edge of self-sabotage, bossing Richard around by the end of the day.

References

External links
 

Grey's Anatomy (season 11) episodes
2015 American television episodes